"Baby Let Me Take You (In My Arms)" is a song written by Abrim Tilmon and performed by The Detroit Emeralds.  It reached #4 on the R&B chart and #24 on the Billboard Hot 100 in 1972.  The song was featured on their 1972 album, You Want It, You Got It.

The song was produced by Katouzzion and arranged by Abrim Tilmon and Johnny Allen.

The single was ranked #95 on Billboard's Year-End Hot 100 singles of 1972.

Chart history

Weekly charts

Year-end charts

Sampled
Joe Budden sampled "Baby Let Me Take You (In My Arms)" on his song "#1" from his 2003 album Joe Budden.
 Eazy-E sampled "Baby Let Me Take You (In My Arms)" on his song Eazy-Duz-It from the 1988 album Eazy-Duz-It.
De La Soul sampled "Baby Let Me Take You (In My Arms)" on their song "Say No Go" from their 1989 album, 3 Feet High and Rising.
 Deja-Vu sampled "Baby Let Me Take You (In My Arms)" on their song "Going Under" (1998).
 Krayzie Bone And Wish Bone sampled "Baby Let Me Take You (In My Arms)" on their song "12 Gauge" (2003).

References

1972 songs
1972 singles
The Detroit Emeralds songs